Filipino American cuisine has been present in America ever since Filipinos moved there, but only recently has the Filipino food become more widely popular. Filipino food has gone through its evolution of adapting other cultures' food practices into their own, or borrowing the food concept into their own.

Filipinos took their food and debut it as they came to America by presenting it in catering and opening up the Philippines' most popular food chain, Jollibee. There is also a long list of different Filipino types of dishes that represent Filipino Americans.

American influence
American influence on Filipino food is how some authentic meal was turned into frozen, ready-cooked meals. This technique was used on Filipino dishes when Marigold Commodities Corporation teamed up with Ditta Meat Food Service Company to create these frozen Filipino meals. They started in Austin, Texas, and released a few dishes that would incorporate the meat of America with Philippine flavors to create Filipino American food.

Types of food
There were four of these Americanized Filipino dishes released into Texas under the work of Marigold Commodities and Ditta Meat Food Service. Beef tapa uses Texas meat marinated with garlic, citrus flavors, and soy sauce, then grilled or fried. The other dishes are tocino using chicken and pork meat, and pork longaniza.

Restaurants

Catering
The Filipino restaurant trend of catering is continued in many restaurants such as Sunda in Chicago and Purple Yam in Brooklyn. They have also continued to sell typical Filipino dishes in bulk such as lechon.

Types of Filipino American dishes
A typical Filipino American dish consists of a soup, ulam (any food), kanin (rice), type of meat, fruits, and dipping sauces.

Different soups may include things such as Munnggo gisado masabaw, a soup consisting of Mung beans and pork or shrimp. Another soup dish is pancit molo, a Filipino style of the Chinese wonton soup. Meat dishes include adobo made with pork or chicken; the dish is then cooked with vinegar, soy sauce, and garlic.

Suman banana leaves containing sticky rice can be dipped in sugar to make it sweeter. Taho is a dessert that uses a syrup and boba inside of a jello-like soybean material. There are numerous different Filipino dishes, and these are only a couple of them.

Staples in Filipino Food

Rice
Rice is a staple to Filipinos more than how cereal is known to be a basic breakfast food. Rice is used to help intensify some flavors, or create other Filipino dishes like puto and bibingka. Puto can be meat-filled, ube-filled, or turned into cakes; it is made by making rice into flour.

Rice is also created into a dessert called suman, a sweet rice wrapped in a leaf from a coconut or banana.

Coconut
Coconut, like rice, is another staple in Filipino dishes; it is known as, buko, in the Philippine language and can be used in drinks, main dishes, or desserts. There are dishes native to a specific region such as how in Quezon they make a dish using a leaf wrapped shrimp, buko strips, and cook it in buko water. Another region uses buko to mix it with chicken and ginger and cooking it inside of the buko; they also make a noodle dish where the noodles are made of coconut. The white insides of the coconut are used to make milk, ginataan, and halo-halo, among others.

Filipino American health

Food and health
A 2012 study across Asian American subgroups in Southern California (Chinese, Filipino, Korean, Japanese, and Vietnamese Americans) found that Filipino Americans self-reported the highest body mass indexes (BMIs). This is because after the migration of Filipinos to the U.S. their diets changed and showed to have increase in energy-dense food, processed food, decrease in fruits, vegetables.

This seems to have has a negative effect on the body leading to increase body weight and other health-related problems. Specifically in Filipino American diets, there was an increase in milk, meat consumption, less starchy food and snacks. This increase in eating by Filipinos has led to an increase in the calorie intake. This increase was almost doubled and along with it was a double in protein consumption and triple consumption of fat.

U.S. and Canada
There was a study done in Canada on the average Filipino woman's health focusing mainly on the idea of body size, eating, and health. Western culture has spread an idea that there is a concept of "healthy" and this concept in terms of woman would be that there is an association with being thin is attractive and vice versa for being fatter. The study was then analyzed and what was found is that there was a risk of being "fat" associated with eating rice and an association of being thinner when watching fat and rice.

See also

 Filipino cuisine
 Filipino Americans

References

Philippine fusion cuisine
American fusion cuisine
Asian-American cuisine
Filipino-American culture
Filipino diaspora